Barki, or Burki, is a village in Lahore District of Punjab, Pakistan near the city of Lahore. It is located near the border with Punjab, India. Before the partition of India in 1947, it joined through Harikey Road. It is about 11 kilometers from Allama Iqbal International Airport. It is on the bank of Bambawali-Ravi-Bedian Canal. It gives its name to the Battle of Burki, which took place during the Indo-Pakistani War of 1965.

It is a centre of education for the border belt. Malik Meraj Khalid, former Caretaker Prime Minister of Pakistan and Speaker of the National Assembly of Pakistan, founded Anjuman Ikhwan-e-Islam in 1939 and later on Ikhwan school and college in the village. Later a separate degree college for boys was founded.

In popular culture 

This village is mentioned in the 1999 Punjabi movie Shaheed-E-Mohabbat, which is based on the story of Boota and Zainab Singh. Zainab's family migrated to Burki after the independence of Pakistan in 1947.

See also
 Shaheed-E-Mohabbat
 Punjab region
 Punjab before 1947
 East Punjab
 West Punjab
 Punjabi language

References

External link

Villages in Lahore District